Matthias Christian Rabbethge (1 March 1804, Klein Rodensleben – 26 December 1902, Klein Wanzleben) was a German sugar beet grower and sugar manufacturer.

External links 
  150 Jahre KWS Saat AG

1804 births
1902 deaths
German agronomists